Godwin's Halt railway station served the city of Highfield, Hertfordshire, England from 1905 to 1964 on the Nickey Line.

History 
The station opened on 9 August 1905 by the Midland Railway. It was situated west of a footpath that linked Pennine and Saturn Way. A siding was added in 1884 with a second one being added shortly after. A shelter was added in 1907 after a petition was raised. The station closed to passengers on 16 June 1947 and closed to goods traffic on 2 March 1964.

References

External links 

Disused railway stations in Hertfordshire
Former Midland Railway stations
Railway stations opened in 1905
Railway stations closed in 1949
1905 establishments in England
1964 disestablishments in England
Railway stations in Great Britain opened in the 20th century